Good Advice is the fourth studio album by Canadian recording artist Basia Bulat, released on February 12, 2016 by Secret City Records. The album was produced by Jim James.

Track listing

Charts

References

2016 albums
Basia Bulat albums
Secret City Records albums
Albums produced by Jim James